Enkianthus cernuus, the nodding enkianthus, is a species of flowering plant in the family Ericaceae, native to southern Japan. A shrub or small tree that prefers to grow in wet areas, Enkianthus cernuus f. rubens, the drooping red enkianthus, has gained the Royal Horticultural Society's Award of Garden Merit.

References

Ericaceae
Endemic flora of Japan
Plants described in 1894